Dawson is a town in Navarro County,  in the U.S. state of Texas. The population was 807 at the 2010 census.

History
The town was established in 1847 and was the second town established in the county.

Geography

Dawson is located at  (31.895427, –96.715345).

Demographics
As of the census of 2000,  852 people, 361 households, and 229 families were residing in the town. The population density was 480.8 people per square mile (185.9/km2). The 408 housing units averaged 230.2 per square mile (89.0/km2). The racial makeup of the town was 80.99% White, 15.14% African American, 0.12% Native American, 0.12% Asian, 1.64% from other races, and 2.00% from two or more races. Hispanics or Latinos of any race were 6.34% of the population.

Of the 361 households, 25.2% had children under the age of 18 living with them, 46.8% were married couples living together, 13.0% had a female householder with no husband present, and 36.3% were not families. About 34.6% of all households were made up of individuals, and 23.0% had someone living alone who was 65 years of age or older. The average household size was 2.36, and the average family size was 3.07.

In the town, the population was distributed as 24.1% under the age of 18, 7.6% from 18 to 24, 23.9% from 25 to 44, 21.7% from 45 to 64, and 22.7% who were 65 years of age or older. The median age was 40 years. For every 100 females, there were 90.6 males. For every 100 females age 18 and over, there were 81.2 males.

Males had a median income of $30,250 versus $20,417 for females. The per capita income for the town was $13,190. About 13.2% of families and 20.9% of the population were below the poverty line, including 27.8% of those under age 18 and 27.1% of those age 65 or over.

Education
The Town of Dawson is served by the Dawson Independent School District.

Braniff Flight 352 
Braniff Flight 352 was a scheduled domestic flight from William P. Hobby Airport in Houston, Texas, to Love Field in Dallas. On May 3, 1968, a Lockheed L-188A Electra flying on the route, registration N9707C, broke up in midair and crashed near Dawson, Texas, after flying into a severe thunderstorm. It was carrying a crew of five and 80 passengers. No one survived. Investigation revealed that the accident was caused by the captain's decision to penetrate an area of heavy weather followed by a structural overstress and failure of the airframe while attempting recovery from loss of control during a steep 180° turn executed in an attempt to escape the weather.

Notable people

 Anjanette Comer, actress
 Lester Roloff, Independent Baptist evangelist and controversial teen group home operator

Climate
The climate in this area is characterized by hot, humid summers and generally mild to cool winters.  According to the Köppen climate classification, Dawson has a humid subtropical climate,Cfa on climate maps.

References

Towns in Navarro County, Texas
Towns in Texas
Populated places established in 1847
1847 establishments in Texas